Renau is a municipality in the comarca of the Tarragonès in Catalonia, Spain. It is situated on the right bank of the Gaià river, which is dammed to form the Gaià reservoir. A local road links the village with Vilabella and with the N-240 road  between Tarragona and Valls.

References

 Panareda Clopés, Josep Maria; Rios Calvet, Jaume; Rabella Vives, Josep Maria (1989). Guia de Catalunya, Barcelona: Caixa de Catalunya.  (Spanish).  (Catalan).

External links
 Government data pages 
 A short visit to Renau – Mare de Déu de Loreto Hermitage by Josep Maria Jujol 

Municipalities in Tarragonès
Populated places in Tarragonès